The Tri-City Railroad (TCRY) is a privately owned Class III railroad established in 1999. It was founded by Randolph Peterson and is still owned by the Peterson family today.

The rail line Tri-City Railroad operates on is located in Richland, Washington and owned by the Port of Benton. Called the Southern Connection, it was constructed between 1949 and 1950 as a link to the rail lines inside the Hanford Nuclear Reservation.
 
Tri-City Railroad contracted with Pacific Northwest National Laboratory in 2005 to assist in its development of the Radiation Portal Monitoring System technology for the U.S. Department of Homeland Security's use at railroad border crossings nationwide.  In 2014 it contracted with Pacific Northwest National Laboratory to assist in testing for shock and vibration in the movement of spent nuclear fuel by rail.

In 2011, Tri-City began operating on Mare Island in California.

Equipment

References

Washington (state) railroads